The 1938–39 AHL season was the third season of the International-American Hockey League, known in the present day as the American Hockey League. It was also the first season that the I-AHL played as a fully unified league. For the previous two seasons, the International Hockey League and Canadian-American Hockey League had played as a "circuit of mutual convenience" with an interlocking schedule. However, on June 29, 1938, the IHL and C-AHL formally merged into a single circuit under the I-AHL name.

Eight teams played 54 games each in the schedule. The Hershey Bears won the F. G. "Teddy" Oke Trophy as the Western Division champions, while the Cleveland Barons won the Calder Cup as league champions.

Team changes
One of the I-AHL's first acts as a fully merged league was to grant an expansion franchise to the Hershey Bears, based in Hershey, Pennsylvania. The Bears transferred from the Eastern Amateur Hockey League to the I-AHL's West Division. The Bears have been in the I-AHL/AHL ever since, without relocating or renaming. As of the end of the 2016–17 season, they are the oldest team in the league, and the seventh oldest team in all of professional hockey (behind only the NHL's Original Six) still playing in its current city and under its current name.

Final standings
Note: GP = Games played; W = Wins; L = Losses; T = Ties; GF = Goals for; GA = Goals against; Pts = Points;

Scoring leaders

Note: GP = Games played; G = Goals; A = Assists; Pts = Points; PIM = Penalty minutes

Calder Cup playoffs

See also
List of AHL seasons

References
AHL official site
AHL Hall of Fame
HockeyDB
hockeyleaguehistory.com

American Hockey League seasons
2